Adolphe-Edmond Blanc (1799-1850) was a French lawyer and politician. He served in the Chamber of Deputies from 1832 to 1837, and from 1842 to 1848, representing Haute-Vienne. He was conservative.

References

1799 births
1850 deaths
Politicians from Paris
Orléanists
Members of the 2nd Chamber of Deputies of the July Monarchy
Members of the 3rd Chamber of Deputies of the July Monarchy
Members of the 6th Chamber of Deputies of the July Monarchy
Members of the 7th Chamber of Deputies of the July Monarchy
Members of the Conseil d'État (France)
19th-century French lawyers
Officiers of the Légion d'honneur